Columbus Vance Henkel Jr. was a North Carolina politician.

He was born in Statesville, North Carolina, September 16, 1908.  He was the son of Columbus Vance Henkel and Lila Dunavant. He served five terms in the North Carolina Senate and ran for Lieutenant Governor of North Carolina in 1960.

After his death in 1971, the North Carolina General Assembly enacted a resolution to "record its appreciation of his life and his contributions to the State of North Carolina."

References 

 Miller, Mildred J., ed.  The Heritage of Iredell County.  Statesville, NC:  Genealogical Society of Iredell Co., 1980.
 Men of Achievement in the Carolinas.  Charlotte:  Men of Achievement, Inc., 1952

1908 births
1971 deaths
North Carolina state senators
20th-century American politicians